Jock Young is a former British slalom canoeist who competed in the 1980s.

He won a gold medal in the C-2 team event at the 1981 ICF Canoe Slalom World Championships in Bala.

References
Overview of athlete's results at CanoeSlalom.net

British male canoeists
Living people
Year of birth missing (living people)
Medalists at the ICF Canoe Slalom World Championships